No. 548 Squadron RAF was a fighter squadron of the Royal Air Force (RAF) from 1943 to 1945.

History
The squadron was formed at Lawnton, near Brisbane, Queensland, Australia on 15 December 1943 to provide air defence duties with Spitfires, as the RAAF Kittyhawks were inadequate for interception missions. It was first formed under the command of Squadron Leader Dave Glaser, a RAF veteran of the Battle of Britain. The first months were spent training with Wirraways and de Havilland Tiger Moths, but in April 1944 the squadron's Spitfires arrived. The squadron was made up of RAF aircrew and RAAF groundstaff. On 15 June 1944 the squadron moved initially to Livingstone Airfield and Strauss Airfield in the Northern Territory of Australia. The squadron was then relocated in October 1944 to Parap Airfield in Darwin, Northern Territory.

Only two offensive operations were undertaken by the squadron before the Japanese surrender. A sweep was conducted over Selaru Island, 300 miles north of Darwin, on 5 September 1944, and the airfield at Cape Chater, Timor was attacked on 3 June 1945.

Disbandment

There has been confusion regarding when the squadron disbanded. According to some sources, the squadron was disbanded at Parap Airfield (Darwin/Civil), Northern Territory on 9 October 1945. A more recent source states that it was disbanded on 31 October at Melbourne, Victoria. The confusion is likely the result of misreadings of the squadron's Operations Record Book, which includes a handwritten note that "Sqn disbanded on 9 Oct 1945", in line with Air Force Command Order B443/45; just above this note is what appears to be a correction, at first glance appearing to be the number 31 but more likely the numeral 3 followed by a correction mark.

The squadron's Personnel Occurrence Reports (POR) show that the squadron was wound down during September 1945, when RAAF ground staff were either posted to other units or demobilised. The squadron's RAF pilots meanwhile ferried their aircraft out of the Northern Territory and were posted to Melbourne, mostly during the period 16-23 September, and given permission to "live out" while the RAF organised for their return home to the United Kingdom. The squadron's final POR, dated 2 October 1945, notes that the last member, Flying Officer I. H. Lance, RAAF, a ground staff officer who was likely the Adjutant, was posted to another squadron with effect from 3 October. It would appear therefore that the disbandment process was completed on 3 October 1945, six days ahead of the scheduled date of 9 October.

Aircraft operated

Squadron bases

Commanding officers

See also
List of Royal Air Force aircraft squadrons

References

Notes

Bibliography

External links
 History of No. 548 Squadron at raf.mod.uk
 History of No.'s 541–598 Squadrons at RAF Web
 712 Squadron Australia Air Force Cadets Information

548 Squadron
Military units and formations established in 1943
Fighter squadrons of the Royal Air Force in World War II